Vila Robert Williams (now Caála) was a town in Huambo province of Angola, in the then Portuguese Angola (before 1975). The town of Robert Williams was just west of Nova Lisboa (now Huambo) and was remarkable for huge outcroppings of boulders that jutted from the fields just outside the town. In those outcroppings researchers could find pottery shards, primitive metal smelting pits, and other archeological detritus. It is named after the Robert Williams who founded the Robert Williams and Company.

See also
 Sir Robert Williams

References

Populated places in Cuando Cubango Province